Factory Bot, originally known as Factory Girl, is a software library for the Ruby programming language that provides factory methods to create test fixtures for automated software testing.  The fixture objects can be created on the fly; they may be plain Ruby objects with a predefined state, ORM objects with existing database records or mock objects.

Factory Bot is often used in testing Ruby on Rails applications; where it replaces Rails' built-in fixture mechanism. Rails' default setup uses a pre-populated database as test fixtures, which are global for the complete test suite. Factory Bot, on the other hand, allows developers to define a different setup for each test and thus helps to avoid dependencies within the test suite.

Factories

Defining Factories 
A factory is defined by a name and its set of attributes. The class of the test object is either determined through the name of the factory or set explicitly.

FactoryBot.define do
  # Determine class automatically
  factory :user do
    name { "Captain Minion" }
    superhero { false }
  end
  
  # Specify class explicitly
  factory :superhero, class: User do
    name { "Tony Stark" }
    superhero { true }
  end
end

Features

Traits 
Traits allow grouping of attributes which can be applied to any factory.

factory :status do 
  title { "Seeking for Full Time jobs" }
 
  trait :international do
    international { true }
  end
 
  trait :resident do
    international { false }
  end
 
  trait :comp_sci do
    comp_sci { true }
  end
 
  trait :electrical do
    comp_sci { false }
  end
 	
  factory :comp_sci_international_student,  traits: [:international, :comp_sci]
  factory :electrical_resident_student,  traits: [:resident, :electrical]
end

Alias 
Factory Bot allows creating aliases for existing factories so that the factories can be reused.

factory :user, aliases: [:student, :teacher] do
  first_name { "John" }
end
 
factory :notice do
  teacher
  # Alias used ''teacher'' for ''user''
  title { "Office Hours" }
 end
 
factory :notification do
  student
  #Alias used student for user 
  title { "Lecture timings" }
end

Sequences 
Factory Bot allows creating unique values for a test attribute in a given format.

FactoryBot.define do
  factory :title do
    sequence(:name) {|n| "Title #{n}" }
    # Title 1, Title 2 and so on...
  end
end

Inheritance 
Factories can be inherited while creating a factory for a class. This allows the user to reuse common attributes from parent factories and avoid writing duplicate code for duplicate attributes. Factories can be written in a nested fashion to leverage inheritance.

factory :user do
  name { "Micheal" }

  factory :admin do
    admin_rights true
  end
end

admin_user = create(:admin)
admin_user.name   # Micheal
admin_user.admin_rights   # true

Parent factories can also be specified explicitly.
factory :user do
  name { "Micheal" }
end

factory :admin, parent: :user do
  admin_user { true }
end

Callback 
Factory Bot allows custom code to be injected at four different stages:
 Code can be injected after the factory is built
 Code can be injected before the factory is saved
 Code can be injected after the factory is saved
 Code can be injected before the factory is stubbed

See also

Other Test libraries for Ruby 
NullDB: a way to speed up testing by avoiding database use.
Fixture Builder: a tool that compiles Ruby factories into fixtures before a test run.
Shoulda: an extension to test/unit with additional helpers, macros, and assertions.
Rspec: a behavior-driven development framework
Capybara: Acceptance test framework for web applications.

References 

Ruby (programming language)